The Grand Gendarme is a minor summit on the Weisshorn north ridge in the Pennine Alps. Because of its prominence it was included in the enlarged list of alpine four-thousanders.

References

External links 
 List of Alpine four-thousanders

Alpine four-thousanders
Mountains of the Alps
Mountains of Valais
Pennine Alps
Mountains of Switzerland
Four-thousanders of Switzerland